In American slang, the term inside baseball refers to the minutiae and detailed inner workings of a system that are only interesting to, or appreciated by, experts, insiders, and aficionados. The phrase was originally used as a sports metaphor in political contexts, but has expanded to discussions of other topics as well. Language commentator William Safire wrote that the term refers to details about a subject that require such a specific knowledge about what is being discussed that the nuances are not understood or appreciated by outsiders.

Etymology
The term originated in the 1890s referring to a particular style of playing the game which relied on singles, walks, bunts, and stolen bases rather than power hitting. Within a few decades the term was being used to mean highly specialized knowledge about baseball, and by the 1950s it was being applied to politics.

References

English phrases
American slang
Political terminology of the United States